Canute II the Tall, was King of Sweden from 1229 until his death in 1234. He was the father of Holmger Knutsson, a later pretender for the Swedish throne. Both father and son were members of the   House of Folkung (Folkungar).

Family
Not much is certain about his background. An unreliable, late fourteenth century source calls him "Knut Joansson", but the dominating theory is that he was identical with "Knut Holmgersson" who was a member of King Eric XI's council and was a relative to the king, and that his father was the man Holmger who was called a "nepos" of King Canute I of Sweden. This theory is supported by the fact that one of Knut's sons was named Holmger. Nepos usually meant nephew, but could be used for other younger relatives. If these identifications are correct, Canute would be the great-grandson of king Eric the holy. A few historians have instead suggested that the late source might be correct and that Canute's father was Jon Jarl.
 
Some sources give Canute's spouse as Danish noble woman Helena Pedersdatter Strange ( c. 1200–1255). However this theory has been challenged by noted historian Hans Gillingstam (1925–2016), who instead believed that he was married to an unknown woman from the House of Bjelbo, evidenced by the Coat of arms on the tomb cover of his son Holmger.
Canute had the sons Holmger Knutsson (d. 1248) and Philip Knutsson (d. 1251), who both died in Folkung uprisings against Birger Jarl.

Biography
In 1220, Canute donated land to two Dominican friars at Sko in Uppland. They left after a while, and the land instead formed the nucleus of the Sko Abbey  
(Skokloster)for cistercian nuns. According to a 16th-century source, he was eventually buried there.

Canute was probably a member of the council that ruled Sweden from 1222 to 1229, during the minority of King Eric XI of Sweden. In 1229 or 1230, Eric was overthrown after the Battle of Olustra in Södermanland. Canute's exact involvement in the rising is unclear: he might have participated, or been a compromise candidate. He was recognized in 1231 at the latest, but his time in office was short. The sources contradict each other on the matter of Eric's return: the Lund annals claim that Eric returned before the death of Canute in 1232, the Eric Chronicle that he returned following the death of Canute and after renewed fighting. Sturla Tordsson claimed that Canute for a while was co-regent with King  Eric X, which could indicate that he was co-regent with Eric XI during some part of his reign.

Canute's reign likely saw the revision of some Swedish laws: creditors could no longer enter the homes of debtors to collect debts without the assistance of a government official, and the king was required to hold judicial reviews at least every third year. These changes have been noted as having taken place in the reign of King Canute, and due to chronological considerations, Canute II is thought to be most likely.

References

Works cited

Bibliography
Adolfsson,  Mats När borgarna brann - svenska uppror (Stockholm: Natur & Kultur, 2007)
Larsson, Mats G. Götarnas riken : upptäcktsfärder ill Sveriges enande (Bokförlaget Atlantis AB. 2002)

External links

1234 deaths
13th-century Swedish monarchs
Rulers of Finland
Year of birth unknown
Usurpers